Schloss Benrath (Benrath Palace) is a Baroque-style maison de plaisance (pleasure palace) in Benrath, which is now a borough of Düsseldorf. It was erected for the Elector Palatine Charles Theodor and his wife, Countess Palatine Elisabeth Auguste of Sulzbach, by his garden and building director Nicolas de Pigage. Construction began in 1755 and was completed in 1770. The ensemble at Benrath has been proposed for designation as a UNESCO World Heritage Site.

Buildings 
The main building, the central corps de logis, for the Elector Palatine and his wife is flanked by two arched symmetrical wings, the maisons de cavalière, which originally housed the servants. They partially surround a circular pond, the Schlossweiher (palace pond), in the north. On the southside lies a long rectangular pond, the Spiegelweiher (mirror pond). From the predescant castle, which stood formerly in the mid of the long rectangular pond on the southside of the palace, is conserved only one of the servant wings, the so-called Alte Orangerie (Old Orangery).

Museums 
The main building corps de logis is a museum with guided tours. Sometimes music concerts are also performed. The two wings house two museums since 2002: the Museum for European Garden Art in the east wing and the Museum of Natural History in the west wing.

Park 
It is surrounded by a Baroque square hunting park with two crossing diagonal alleys and a circular alley.

See also 
 List of Baroque residences

References 
Schloss Benrath official website

External links 

 

Houses completed in 1770
Buildings and structures in Düsseldorf
Benrath
Tourist attractions in Düsseldorf
Rococo architecture in Germany
Museums in Düsseldorf
Parks in Germany
Natural history museums in Germany
Historic house museums in Germany
Gardens in North Rhine-Westphalia
Water castles in North Rhine-Westphalia
1770 establishments in the Holy Roman Empire